During warfare, some units take more casualties than other units. Sometimes, the casualty rate is disproportionately high. This article displays the highest percentage of casualties among American units, including those wiped out as an effective force.

The term casualty in warfare can often be confusing. It often refers not to those that are killed on the battlefield but to those who can no longer fight. That can include disabled by injuries, disabled by psychological trauma, captured, deserted, or missing. A casualty is just a soldier who is no longer available for the immediate battle or campaign, the major consideration in combat. The number of casualties is simply the number of members of a unit who are not available for duty. For example, during the Seven Days Battles in the American Civil War (June 25 to July 1, 1862) there were 5,228 killed, 23,824 wounded and 7,007 missing or taken prisoner for a total of 36,059 casualties.  The word casualty has been used in a military context since at least 1513.

Battles

US units with most casualties per conflict

See also
 Deadliest single days of World War I
 List of battles with most United States military fatalities

Notes

References

Sources
 - Total pages: 290
 - Total pages: 508

 - Total pages: 257
 
 - Total pages: 2524 

 - Total pages: 608 
 - Total pages: 465 

United States
Battles
Battles
United States
United States
American Civil War-related lists
Battles of the American Civil War